Marjorie Tallchief (born Marjorie Louise Tall Chief; October 19, 1926November 30, 2021) was an American ballerina and member of the Osage Nation. She was the younger sister of the late prima ballerina, Maria Tallchief, and was the first Native American to be named "première danseuse étoile" in the Paris Opera Ballet.

Early life
Tallchief was born October 19, 1926, in Denver, Colorado, while her parents, Alexander Tall Chief and his wife, Ruth (née Porter), were on a family vacation with her older siblings, brother Gerald and sister Maria. She grew up in Fairfax, Oklahoma, until 1933, when her family moved to Los Angeles so she and her sister could train in ballet dancing. She trained with Bronislava Nijinska and David Lichine. Her father was a member of the Osage Nation, while her mother was of Scottish-Irish descent.

Career
After completing her training in Los Angeles, Tallchief began performing for several dance companies. In the book American Indian Ballerinas, Lili Cockerille Livingston wrote that Tallchief had her professional debut with Lucia Chase and Richard Pleasant's Ballet Theatre as a first year soloist, in 1944. According to the Encyclopedia of Oklahoma History and Culture, these included: "the American Ballet Russe de Monte Carlo (1946–47), the Grand Ballet du Marquis de Cuevas (1948–55), Ruth Page's Chicago Opera Ballet (guest artist, 1958–62), and the Harkness Ballet (prima ballerina, 1964–66). Her most acclaimed roles were performed in Night Shadow (1950), Annabel Lee (1951), Idylle (1954), Romeo and Juliet (1955), and Giselle (1957)."

Tallchief was the first American and Native American to be "première danseuse étoile" of the Paris Opera Ballet and performed with the Grand Ballet du Marquis de Cuevas. During her career she also performed for dignitaries such as U.S. Presidents John F. Kennedy and Lyndon B. Johnson, and French President Charles de Gaulle. Tallchief taught at Dallas Civic Ballet Academy, later known as the Dallas Ballet. After her retirement from the stage, she acted as a dance director for the Dallas Ballet, the Chicago Ballet School, and the Harid Conservatory until 1993. She and her sister Maria also co-founded the Chicago City Ballet in 1980.

Accolades
In 1991, Tallchief was inducted into the Oklahoma Hall of Fame. In October 1997, she and her elder sister Maria, along with Moscelyne Larkin, Rosella Hightower, and Yvonne Chouteau, were named Oklahoma Treasures at the Governor's Arts Awards. A bronze statue of her along with the other Five Moons were unveiled in 2007  on the grounds of the Tulsa Historical Society.

Personal life
Tallchief had two children with her husband, the director and choreographer George Skibine, whom she married in 1947. She lived in Boca Raton, Florida, where she died on November 30, 2021, at the age of 95.

References

Osage people
1926 births
2021 deaths
American ballerinas
American people of Scotch-Irish descent
American expatriates in France
Prima ballerinas
Five Moons
People from Denver
People from Fairfax, Oklahoma
People from Greater Los Angeles
Paris Opera Ballet étoiles
Harkness Ballet dancers
Dancers from Colorado
Dancers from Oklahoma
20th-century American ballet dancers
20th-century Native American women
20th-century Native Americans
21st-century Native American women
21st-century Native Americans